Birth trauma may refer to: 
 Childbirth-related posttraumatic stress disorder, psychological trauma to the mother following childbirth
Birth trauma (physical), physical trauma to the infant following childbirth, as described at ICD-10 codes P10-P15
Birth trauma (psychoanalysis), a concept in Freudian psychoanalysis described by Otto Rank